Young Chasers is the debut studio album by British indie rock band, Circa Waves. The album was released 30 March 2015 through Virgin EMI Records. The album has been certified silver in the United Kingdom by British Phonographic Industry.

Track listing

Charting

References

External links 
 
 

2015 debut albums
Circa Waves albums
Virgin EMI Records albums